Sirje Kingsepp (born 13 September 1969 in Kiviõli) is an Estonian politician and celebrity.

Biography
She is a former reality TV show Baar participant, also known as Baari-Sirje (Sirje of "Baar"), and a former chairperson of the Estonian Left Party

Kingsepp has mainly caught attention with her legal action against Eesti Päevaleht concerning publication of Feminist and Socialist but not Communist, a political profile story by Eesti Päevaleht while she was still an active politician.  The story was written with Kingsepp's active cooperation and originally published on 23 December 2004.  It was available via Eesti Päevaleht's web archive until December 2008 when she requested its withdrawal on grounds of it containing her personal data, particularly marital status, number of children, and location of birth, education, and residence.  Subsequently,  backed the request; Eesti Päevaleht complied but appealed to Tallinn Administrative Court.  In June 2009, the court upheld the request on grounds that public interest towards Kingsepp's person has ceased since she withdrew from active politics, and that her former party is a "completely marginal" organisation. Accordingly, the story was no longer available on Eesti Päevaleht's website. It could still be read in libraries that maintain archives of newspapers. From 19 August 2010 it is again available due to the ruling of the Supreme Court of Estonia.

Further reading 
 Eesti Päevaleht 2 January 2009: Andmekaitse: Kingseppa puudutav otsus ei sündinud kergelt, interview with Viljar Peep, director of Estonian Data Protection Inspection
 Eesti Päevaleht 19 August 2010: Kohus: ajaleht ei pea varem ilmunud artiklit kustutama, about a new court order.

References

External links 
 Kas uudishimu on sõnavabadus? Eesti Päevaleht. 30 June 2009
 Eesti Päevaleht 23 December 2004: Feminist ja sotsialist, aga mitte kommunist by Tuuli Koch

1969 births
Living people
Estonian women in politics
Estonian feminists
Estonian socialists
People from Kiviõli
Socialist feminists